Lio Tipton (born Analeigh Tipton; November 9, 1988) is an American actor and fashion model. Tipton is known for being the last eliminated on Cycle 11 of America's Next Top Model and for their roles in the films Crazy, Stupid, Love (2011), Warm Bodies (2013), and Two Night Stand (2014).

Early life
Tipton was born on November 9, 1988, in Minneapolis, Minnesota. They began ice skating at two and a half years old. When Tipton was eight years old, their family relocated to Sacramento, California and they went to school in Placerville, California.

Tipton competed in four U.S. Synchronized Skating Championships. Tipton and their pair partner, Phillip Cooke, twice became regional champions, and competed twice at the U.S. Junior Figure Skating Championships on the Juvenile level. Tipton retired from competitive skating at 16 but continued to skate in charity ice shows for AIDS foundations and to rebuild a rink damaged in a fire.

They attended Marymount California University in Rancho Palos Verdes, California.

Career

Modeling
Prior to America's Next Top Model, Tipton was signed to I Model & Talent in Los Angeles and walked in Los Angeles Fashion Week for designer Kelly Nishimoto's Fall 2008 collection, Imasu.

Tipton became the last eliminated on Cycle 11 of America's Next Top Model in 2008. They were recruited through Myspace and asked to audition in Los Angeles. At the beginning of the show, Tipton revealed that they once encountered sex traffickers posing as modeling agents. They were then sold to a Saudi Arabian prince, but managed to get out of the situation before the deal was finalized. Tipton was called first twice, one for the first CoverGirl commercial, which Tyra Banks deemed "the best CoverGirl commercial in the history of America's Next Top Model." They also won the go-sees challenge by booking all three of their go-sees and getting back on time. They were subsequently eliminated in the finale after forgetting their lines in the second CoverGirl commercial, which left Samantha Potter and McKey Sullivan to walk in the finale runway show.

Tipton signed with Ford Models in Los Angeles and Abrams Artists Agency, in both the commercial and theatrical divisions. They appeared in Spain's Marie Claire, Seventeen magazine's December 2008–January 2009 edition, a several-page spread in Maxim, and in Vogue. They were also featured in ads for Forever 21 and Guess.

In 2010, they modeled Geren Ford's pre-fall 2010 collection. For Los Angeles Fashion Week, they walked for Skingraft and David Alexander for the S/S 2010 season.

Acting
Tipton and Samantha Potter appeared as guest stars on an episode of the television series The Big Bang Theory in 2008 and by themself in a different role in 2015. Tipton played a babysitter who has a crush on Steve Carell's character in Crazy, Stupid, Love, prompting The New York Times to call them a "face to watch".

Tipton was cast in the third season of HBO's TV comedy Hung, portraying Sandee, a young gigolo's scheming fiancée. They played a supporting role in the zombie-apocalyptic horror-romance Warm Bodies, directed by Jonathan Levine. They had a small role opposite Scarlett Johansson in the 2014 science fiction action film Lucy. They had their first lead role in Two Night Stand, directed by Max Nichols, which was released on September 26, 2014.

In 2014, Tipton was the co-lead in ABC's short-lived comedy series Manhattan Love Story.

In 2018, Tipton played Avery's date, Lauren, on the new season of Murphy Brown (S1:E7, "A Lifetime of Achievement").

Personal life
Tipton announced in June 2021 that they are queer and non-binary, and use they/them pronouns. Tipton married entertainment executive Chaz Salembier in October 2022.

Filmography

Film

Television

Music videos

Web

References

External links

 
 
 
 
 America's Next Top Model portfolio

1988 births
21st-century American actors
Living people
Models from California
Non-binary models
American pair skaters
LGBT figure skaters
American film actors
Queer actors
LGBT models
LGBT people from California
American non-binary actors
Actors from Minneapolis
Actors from Sacramento, California
America's Next Top Model contestants
New York Film Academy alumni
Sportspeople from Minneapolis
Sportspeople from Sacramento, California
Models from Minnesota